The Baba language, Supapyak’, is a Grassfields Bantu language of Cameroon.

Phonology 
Baba has a (C)V(C) syllable structure, with syllabic nasals. The only phonemes that can occur in the final position are /p, m, ŋ, ʔ, r/ and /x/. There are no vowel-initial roots but they can form morphemes.

Between nasals and vowels, voiceless stops become voiced; a noticeable exception is /ɡ͡b/, which is its own separate phoneme. There are also some additional phonological processes that create the allophones of [r~d͡z], [l~d], [j~d͡ʒ], and [ɣ~g~w].

Vowels are also punctuated with contrastive high and low tones.

References

External links 
 ELAR archive of Documentation of Baba'1 (Baba)

Languages of Cameroon
Nun languages